Goleniowy  is a village in the administrative district of Gmina Szczekociny, within Zawiercie County, Silesian Voivodeship, in southern Poland.

The village has an approximate population of 2,000.

In Golenowy lived (1660-1700) Wespazjan Kochowski, prominent poet.

References

Goleniowy